Alexei Antipovitch Potekhin (1829–1908) was a Russian dramatist and novelist.

Biography
He was born at Kineshma, in Kostroma, studied at Jaroslav, and settled in Saint Petersburg. As a novelist he is a realist of much the same school as Pisemsky and especially able in his portrayal of dismal village life. His earlier plays were slow in getting to the stage, as they were blocked by the censors for their attacks on present conditions.

Works

Plays
The Voice of the People Not the Voice of God (1853)
Ill-Gotten Gains Do Not Prosper (1854)
Tinsel (1858)
The Severed Limb (1865)
A Vacant Place (1870)

Novels and tales of peasant life
The Poor Nobles (1859)
For Money, a story of factories
The Sick Woman (1876)
Under the Spell of Money (1876)
Before the Community (1877)
Young Inclinations (1879)
Village Vampires (1880)

Notes

References

 

1829 births
1908 deaths
Novelists from the Russian Empire
Male writers from the Russian Empire
Writers from Saint Petersburg
Russian dramatists and playwrights
Russian male dramatists and playwrights
Honorary members of the Saint Petersburg Academy of Sciences
Russian male novelists
19th-century novelists from the Russian Empire
19th-century dramatists and playwrights from the Russian Empire
19th-century male writers from the Russian Empire
Burials at Tikhvin Cemetery